Giovanni Antonio Francesco Giorgio Landolfo Colonna Romano (1878–1940) was an Italian noble and politician who was the leader of the Social Democracy. He also served as the minister of post and telegraphs between 1922 and 1924 in the Mussolini Cabinet. He was known as the "anthroposophist duke".

Biography
Colonna was born in 1878. From 1907, he started his political career and became a member of the parliament in the period 1909–1921. He founded and published a magazine entitled Rassegna contemporanea which is among the early anthroposophical publications. As of 1914, he was a member of the Italian National Olympic Committee.

Following the general elections on 15 May 1921 he was named as the minister of post and telegraphs in the cabinet led by Giovanni Giolitti. In 1922, Colonna established the Social Democracy party and joined the government of Benito Mussolini as the minister of post and telegraphs, which he held until his resignation in February 1924. He was replaced by Costanzo Ciano in the post. Following this incident, Colonna retired from politics. His another magazine was Lo Stato Democratico (Italian: The Democratic State) which also published anthroposophical articles.

Close to the environments of esotericism and Roman neopaganism of those years, Colonna was part of the UR Group which was established in 1927 (perhaps with the pseudonym of "Arvo", or with those of "Krur" and "Breno").

Colonna died in 1940.

Views
Colonna was an advocate of colonialism and democratic imperialism. During World War I he supported intervention of the Italian Empire through his writings in Rassegna contemporanea which also reflected his radical national views. However, Colonna did not have a consistent political ideology. Instead, he adopted distinct political views depending on the conditions. Following his retirement from politics Colonna became an anti-Fascist.

References

External links

19th-century Italian nobility
20th-century Italian politicians
1878 births
1940 deaths
Government ministers of Italy
Italian magazine founders
Mussolini Cabinet
Italian political party founders
Dukes of Italy
Social Democracy (Italy) politicians